Po Rome (?–1651), also spelled Po Romê, Po Romé or Po Ramo, was the king of Panduranga Champa, reigning from 1627 to 1651.

Po Rome was a Churu chief, originally from present-day Đơn Dương District, Lâm Đồng Province. Prior to his ascent to the throne, he had stayed in Kelantan for several years. He succeeded the throne in 1627. He subdued both Hindu and Muslim factions, forced peace between Chams communities.

King Po Rome built dams and canals to nurture agriculture in Phan Rang basin. During his reign, Champa traded with Siam, Cambodia, Vietnam, India, the Malay world, and even the Western countries including France and Portugal. Champa also raided the areas occupied by Nguyễn lord. Vietnamese Phú Yên governor Văn Phong (文封, he was a Cham) revolted against Nguyễn lord in 1629, but was put down by general Nguyễn Hữu Vinh (阮有榮). In the same year, Po Rome married  (阮福玉誇), daughter of Vietnamese lord Nguyễn Phúc Nguyên. 

In 1651, Po Rome died of wounds in Phú Yên during an outbreak of hostilities between Cham locals and Việt immigrants. His elder brother Po Nraup succeeded.

The current Sakawi Cham standard with its origins based on the Saka Raja standard of the Cham calendar was also likely instituted during the reign of Po Rome.

Cham people were sad to hear his death. They built a temple for him, the  located at Ninh Phước district, Ninh Thuận province.

Family 
King Po Rome had one empress and two noble consorts:
Empress Bia Than Cih (also known as Bia Sucih), daughter of King Po Klaong Mah Nai (also known as Po Mah Taha)
Noble consort Bia Than Can, daughter of a Rhade or Kaho chief
Noble consort Bia Ut, born name Nguyễn Phúc Ngọc Khoa, daughter of Vietnamese lord Nguyễn Phúc Nguyên

References

Kings of Champa
Churu people
1651 deaths
Year of birth unknown